Dick Turpin (26 November 1920 – 7 July 1990) was an English middleweight boxer. He was British and Commonwealth middleweight champion, reputedly being the first black fighter to win a British boxing title. He was elder brother and trainer of the more famous Randolph Turpin, who became world middleweight champion after beating Sugar Ray Robinson in 1951.

Dick was the son of Lionel Turpin who had been born in British Guyana and his wife, Beatrice Elizabeth Whitehouse. He had two brothers Jack, who was a featherweight and Randolph, a middleweight.

Professional career
Turpin fought his first professional bout in March 1939 against Jimmy Griffiths, in Coventry. He lost on points over ten rounds.

He went on to build up a domestic record of 86 fights with 68 wins, 12 losses, 5 draws and one no-contest, before his first title fight. This was for the Commonwealth middleweight title, in May 1948, and was against Richard Bos Murphy of New Zealand. Turpin won the fight, at Coventry, by a knockout in the first round to become Commonwealth champion.

In his next bout, on 28 June 1948, Turpin fought Vince Hawkins for his British middleweight title. The fight was held at Villa Park, Birmingham and Turpin won on points over fifteen rounds. He now held both the British and Commonwealth middleweight titles.

During late 1948 and early 1949, Turpin fought European boxers, drawing and then losing on points against Tiberio Mitri, of Italy, then being knocked out in seven rounds in a non-title fight against the then world middleweight champion, Marcel Cerdan, of France. He then won by a disqualification  against another Frenchman, Robert Charron.

In June 1949, he defended his British and Commonwealth titles against Albert Finch, winning on points after fifteen rounds.

In September 1949, he defended his Commonwealth title against Australian, Dave Sands. The fight was at Harringay Arena, and Turpin was knocked out in the first round, and so only retained his British title.

Turpin then won his next four fights, losing the fifth, on points to the American, Baby Day, before defending his British title against Albert Finch, whom he had beaten in his previous defence. The fight was held in April 1950, in Nottingham and Finch won on points after fifteen rounds.

Having lost both his titles, Turpin had only two more fights, against the Belgian, Cyrille Delannoit, in Brussels, losing on a technical knockout in the sixth, and finally against his old rival Albert Finch, losing on a technical knockout in the eighth. This last fight was in July 1950.

Trainer
Turpin was the trainer of his more successful and famous brother Randolph, who beat Sugar Ray Robinson to take the world middleweight title in 1951.

Professional boxing record

See also
 List of British middleweight boxing champions

References

Sources
 

English male boxers
Middleweight boxers
Sportspeople from Leamington Spa
English people of Guyanese descent
1920 births
1990 deaths